Zabudowania Gajewskie  is a village in the administrative district of Gmina Nowe, within Świecie County, Kuyavian-Pomeranian Voivodeship, in north-central Poland.

The village has a population of 110.

References

Zabudowania Gajewskie